David Kealy (born 9 August 1965 in Dublin) was an Irish soccer player during the 1980s and 1990s. He was more commonly known as "Dax" Kealy.

Career
Kealy was a striker who started out with local side Cambridge Boys where he won the All-Ireland SFAI Barry Cup Final in 1982. He played for Bohemians, Drogheda United, Shamrock Rovers, Bray Wanderers (2 spells) and Longford Town during his career in the League of Ireland. He was a member of the FAI Cup winning side in 1990 with Bray. He captained Longford for a spell during his time there and was their top league goalscorer in 1994/95 with 9 goals.

He played for Rovers in the 1988/89 season and is remembered for scoring a diving header to deny Derry City the league on 2 April 1989. This was his only goal in the Hoops.

He made his League of Ireland debut for Bohs on 3 November 1985. During his two spell at the Carlisle Grounds he scored a total of 8 goals in 64 appearances.

Honours
FAI Cup:
 Bray Wanderers - 1990
Leinster Senior Cup (football)
 Bohemian F.C. - 1985

References 

Republic of Ireland association footballers
Association football forwards
League of Ireland players
Bohemian F.C. players
Drogheda United F.C. players
Bray Wanderers F.C. players
Shamrock Rovers F.C. players
Longford Town F.C. players
Living people
1965 births